Doğan Gürpınar is a Turkish historian whose work focuses on the late Ottoman Empire and the Republic of Turkey. He is employed by Istanbul Technical University.

Works

References

Academic staff of Istanbul Technical University
Scholars of nationalism
Living people
Year of birth missing (living people)
21st-century Turkish historians